Hard Promises is a 1992 American romantic comedy film directed by Martin Davidson. It stars Sissy Spacek and William Petersen.

Plot
A man who dislikes stable work environments has been away for too many years when he finds out that his wife had divorced him and is planning to remarry. He comes home to confront her, trying to persuade her not to get married, aided by their daughter, who loves him despite his wandering ways. The couple finds out they still have feelings for each other but must decide how best to handle the contradiction of their lifestyles.

Cast

Critical reception
Vincent Canby of The New York Times did not care for the film but did praise some of the actors:

On Rotten Tomatoes, the film has an aggregate score of 40% based on 2 positive and 3 negative critic reviews.

References

External links

1991 films
1991 romantic comedy films
American romantic comedy films
Columbia Pictures films
Films directed by Martin Davidson
Films scored by George S. Clinton
Films set in Texas
Films shot in Texas
1990s English-language films
1990s American films